WBAT (1400 AM) is a commercial AM radio station licensed to Marion, Indiana, and serving Grant County, Indiana, including Muncie.  It broadcasts an oldies radio format, with a morning news and talk show, along with sports programming nights and weekends, including Chicago Cubs baseball.  The station is owned by Hoosier AM/FM LLC, and features programming from CBS News Radio. 

WBAT is powered at 1,000 watts non-directional.  The transmitter is on South Miller Ave., off West 2nd Street, near General Motors Marion Stamping Plant.  Programming is also heard on 210 watt FM translator W288DN at 105.5 MHz.

History
It was originally a daytimer on 1600 kilocycles. WBAT was powered at 500 watts by day but was required to go off the air at night. It was owned by the Marion Radio Corporation.

The station eventually switched its frequency to 1400 AM, getting a boost to 1,000 watts and authorization to broadcast around the clock.

References

External links
1400 WBAT facebook

BAT